
Gmina Spytkowice is a rural gmina (administrative district) in Wadowice County, Lesser Poland Voivodeship, in southern Poland.

Villages
Gmina Spytkowice contains the villages and settlements of Bachowice, Lipowa, Miejsce, Półwieś, Ryczów and Spytkowice.

Neighbouring gminas
Gmina Spytkowice is bordered by the gminas of Alwernia, Brzeźnica, Czernichów, Tomice and Zator.

References
Polish official population figures 2006

Spytkowice
Gmina Spytkowice